Luhansk Oblast, also referred to as Luhanshchyna, is the easternmost oblast (province) of Ukraine. The oblast's administrative center is Luhansk. The oblast was established in 1938 and bore the name Voroshilovgrad Oblast (until 1958 and again from 1970 to 1991) in honor of Kliment Voroshilov. Its population is estimated as 

Important cities within the oblast include Alchevsk, Antratsyt, Brianka, Kirovsk, Krasnyi Luch, Krasnodon, Lysychansk, Luhansk, Pervomaisk, Rovenky, Rubizhne, Sverdlovsk, Sievierodonetsk, and Kadiivka.

In 2014, parts of the oblast, including Luhansk, came under the control of Russian-backed separatists who declared the Luhansk People's Republic, leading to a war against government forces. Since the 2022 Russian invasion of Ukraine, the oblast has come almost entirely under Russian occupation and has been the site of heavy fighting; Russia later declared the annexation of the entirety of the oblast as well as three other regions, though the annexation remains internationally unrecognized. As of January 2023, Ukraine is in control of roughly 6-7% of the region and controls only a few settlements like Bilohorivka, Zolotarivka, Chervonopopivka, Makiivka and the outskirts of Kreminna in the western part of the region.

Geography

Luhansk Oblast is located in eastern Ukraine. The area of the oblast (26,700 km2), comprises about 4.42% of the total area of Ukraine.

Its length from north to south is 250 km. Its width from east to west is 190 km.

The abutting Russian oblasts are Belgorod Oblast to the north, Voronezh Oblast to the northeast, Rostov Oblast to the east. Abutting Ukrainian oblasts are Kharkiv Oblast to the west, and Donetsk Oblast to the south.

The region is located in the valley of the Siversky Donets river, which splits the region approximately in half. The southern portion of the region is elevated by the Donetsk Ridge which is located closer to the southern border. The highest point is Mohyla Mechetna which is the highest point of Donetsk Ridge.

The left bank of the Siversky Donets river is part of the Starobilsk Plain. To the north this transforms into the Central Russian Upland.

Adjacent subdivisions
north
Belgorod Oblast, Russia

northeast
Voronezh Oblast, Russia

east
Rostov Oblast, Russia

south
Donetsk Oblast

west
Kharkiv Oblast

History

Soviet Ukraine (1938–1991) 

The oblast originated in 1938 as Voroshylovhrad (Russian: Voroshilovgrad) Oblast after the Donetsk Oblast was split between Voroshylovhrad and Stalino (today Donetsk Oblast) oblasts. After the invasion by Nazi Germany in 1941, the region came under a German military administration, due to its proximity to frontlines. It was occupied at the end of 1942 as part of Case Blue German offensive directed towards Stalingrad.

Soon after the battle of Stalingrad, the Luhansk region (at that time Voroshilovgrad) again became the center of military operations during the Soviet counter-offensive operation Little Saturn in the spring of 1943. In the summer of 1943, the region was liberated from the Nazi Germany Armed Forces. During the Soviet era, the Oblast bore its current name between 1958 and 1970.

During the fateful March Referendum of 1991, 70.16% of all Ukrainians voted to remain a part of the Soviet Union as a sovereign republic, while only 27.99% voted 'no'. In the December 1991 referendum (after the August coup ended all hope of a restored Union), 83.86% of votes in the oblast were in favor of the Declaration of Independence of Ukraine.

Independent Ukraine (1991–2014)

Pro-Russian insurgency (2014–2022) 

On 8 April 2014, following the annexation of Crimea by Russia, pro-Russian separatists occupying the Luhansk Oblast administrative building planned to declare the independence of the region as the Luhansk Parliamentary Republic, after other pro-Russian separatists declared Donetsk People's Republic in the Donetsk Oblast (7 April 2014). When the Luhansk Parliamentary Republic ceased to exist, the separatists declared the Luhansk People's Republic on 27 April 2014. They held a disputed referendum on separating from Ukraine on 11 May 2014. The legitimacy of the referendums was not recognized by any government. Ukraine does not recognize the referendum, while the EU and US said the polls were illegal and fraudulent. Subsequently, the war in Donbas began.

As a result of the war in Donbas, Luhansk insurgents control the southern third of the oblast, which includes the city of Luhansk, the region's most populous city and the capital of the oblast. Due to this, most oblast government functions have moved to Sievierodonetsk, which forces of the Government of Ukraine recaptured in July 2014. Many universities located in the occupied areas have moved to government-controlled cities such as Sievierodonetsk, Starobilsk or Rubizhne. A survey conducted in December 2014 by the Kyiv International Institute of Sociology found that 5.7% of the oblast's population supported their region joining Russia, 84.1% did not support the idea, and the rest were undecided or did not respond. Insurgent-controlled areas were not polled.

Russian occupation (2022–present) 

During the 2022 Russian invasion of Ukraine, Russian ground forces entered the occupied territory of Luhansk Oblast by crossing the Russian border on February 22, 2022. They invaded government-controlled territory across the line of contact and the Russian border on February 24. As of 26 May 2022 had occupied all but 5% of the region.

During the Battle of Donbas, Russian troops attacked and eventually captured the cities of Sieverodonetsk and Lysychansk during May and June 2022 in two of the most significant and most intense battles of the Eastern Ukraine offensive. By 3 July 2022, Russian and allied troops controlled all cities in the oblast.

On 4–5 July 2022, during the international Ukraine Recovery Conference (URC 2022) in Lugano, Finland, Sweden, and the Czech Republic pledged to support the postwar rebuilding of the Luhansk region.

On 11 September 2022, there were unconfirmed reports that Bilohorivka near Lysychansk, was recaptured. On 19 September 2022, Ukrainian forces confirmed this.

A referendum was held in Luhansk on joining the Russian Federation, although Ukraine along with the United Nations and most observers declared the referendum to be illegitimate and fraudulent. Following the staged victory in the voting, the region and the so-called Luhansk People's Republic were absorbed into Russia. The United Nations General Assembly subsequently passed a resolution calling on countries not to recognise what it described as an "attempted illegal annexation" and demanded that Russia "immediately, completely and unconditionally withdraw".

, nearly all of the oblast is under Russian occupation, which claims the oblast as the Luhansk People's Republic (LPR), a self-declared state turned Russian federal subject. The war in Donbas and the subsequent 2022 Russian invasion of Ukraine saw heavy fighting in the oblast, with Sievierodonetsk captured in June by Russian and LPR forces after an assault lasting several weeks, and the oblast's last major settlement under Ukrainian control, Lysychansk, captured by Russian and Russia-backed forces on 2 July. The next day, Russia's Minister of Defence announced that the entire territory of the oblast had been "liberated", but three weeks later the governor of the oblast reported heavy fighting was still ongoing. On 4 September, Ukrainian forces launched a counteroffensive in eastern Ukraine and recaptured small parts of Donetsk Oblast and, on 1 October, Lyman. Ukrainian forces also pushed through the stalemate at the Luhansk Oblast border and most notably recaptured Bilohirivka while engaging LPR Forces in Lysychansk.

Administrative subdivisions

{| class="sortable wikitable"
|-
! English Name  || Local Name || Type || Area (km2) || PopulationCensus 2001 || PopulationEstimate1 Jan 2012 || 
|-
| Alchevsk || Алчевськ || city of regional significance ||align="right"| 49 ||align="right"| 119,193 ||align="right"| 112,071 || Alchevsk
|-
| Antratsyt || Антрацит || city of regional significance ||align="right"| 61 ||align="right"| 90,835 ||align="right"| 78,482 || Antratsit
|-
| Antratsitivsky || Антрацитівський (район) || raion ||align="right"| 1,662 ||align="right"| 36,971 ||align="right"| 31,454 || Antratsit
|-
| Bilokurakynsky || Білокуракинський (район) || raion ||align="right"| 1,436 ||align="right"| 23,807 ||align="right"| 19,858 || Bilokurakyne
|-
| Bilovodsky || Біловодський (район) || raion ||align="right"| 1,597 ||align="right"| 27,559 ||align="right"| 24,459 || Bilovodsk
|-
| Brianka || Брянка || city of regional significance ||align="right"| 64 ||align="right"| 61,357 ||align="right"| 54,085 || Brianca
|-
| Kadiivka || Кадіївка|| city of regional significance ||align="right"| 92 ||align="right"| 108,266 ||align="right"| 92,818 || Kadiivka
|-
| Kirovsk || Кіровськ || city of regional significance ||align="right"| 35 ||align="right"| 45,012 ||align="right"| 36,708 || Kirovsk
|-
| Krasnodon || Краснодон || city of regional significance ||align="right"| 77 ||align="right"| 118,168 ||align="right"| 104,640 || Krasnodon
|-
| Krasnodonsky || Краснодонський (район) || raion ||align="right"| 1,386 ||align="right"| 32,846 ||align="right"| 29,983 || Krasnodon
|-
| Krasnyi Luch || Красний Луч || city of regional significance ||align="right"| 154 ||align="right"| 145,129 ||align="right"| 125,166 || Krasnyi Luch
|-
| Kreminsky || Кремінський (район) || raion ||align="right"| 1,627 ||align="right"| 51,927 ||align="right"| 42,357 || Kreminna
|-
| Luhansk || Луганськ || city of regional significance ||align="right"| 286 ||align="right"| 503,248 ||align="right"| 466,627 || Luhansk
|-
| Lutuhynsky || Лутугинський (район) || raion ||align="right"| 1,057 ||align="right"| 73,914 ||align="right"| 67,977 || Lutuhyne
|-
| Lysychansk || Лисичанськ || city of regional significance ||align="right"| 96 ||align="right"| 133,258 ||align="right"| 120,785 || Lysychansk
|-
| Markivsky || Марківський (район) || raion ||align="right"| 1,166 ||align="right"| 19,002 ||align="right"| 15,991 || Markivka
|-
| Milovsky || Міловський (район)|| raion ||align="right"| 971 ||align="right"| 17,415 ||align="right"| 15,696 || Milove
|-
| Novoaidarsky || Новоайдарський (район) || raion ||align="right"| 1,536 ||align="right"| 28,451 ||align="right"| 25,618 || Novoaidar
|-
| Novopskovsky || Новопсковський (район) || raion ||align="right"| 1,623 ||align="right"| 38,322 ||align="right"| 35,271 || Novopskov
|-
| Perevalsky || Перевальський (район) || raion ||align="right"| 807 ||align="right"| 87,383 ||align="right"| 72,387 || Perevalsk
|-
| Pervomaisk || Первомайськ (Міськрада) || city of regional significance ||align="right"| 89 ||align="right"| 80,622 ||align="right"| 70,581 || Pervomaisk
|-
| Popasniansky || Попаснянський (район) || raion ||align="right"| 1,325 ||align="right"| 50,559 ||align="right"| 41,232 || Popasna
|-
| Rovenky || Ровеньки || city of regional significance ||align="right"| 217 ||align="right"| 91,712 ||align="right"| 84,366 || Rovenky
|-
| Rubizhne || Рубіжне || city of regional significance ||align="right"| 34 ||align="right"| 65,322 ||align="right"| 60,750 || Rubizhne
|-
| Sievierodonetsk || Северодонецьк || city of regional significance ||align="right"| 58 ||align="right"| 129,752 ||align="right"| 120,264 || Sieverodonetsk
|-
| Slovianoserbsky (raion) || Слов'яносербський (район)|| raion ||align="right"| 1,113 ||align="right"| 62,125 ||align="right"| 55,462 || Slovianoserbsk
|-
| Stanychno-Luhansy || Станично-Луганський (район) || raion ||align="right"| 1,896 ||align="right"| 52,762 ||align="right"| 49,732 || Stanychno-Luhanske
|-
| Starobilsky || Старобільський (район) || raion ||align="right"| 1,582 ||align="right"| 57,755 ||align="right"| 47,765 || Starobilsk
|-
| Svativsky || Сватівський (район) || raion ||align="right"| 1,739 ||align="right"| 43,069 ||align="right"| 37,652 || Svatove
|-
| Sverdlovsk || Свердловськ || city of regional significance ||align="right"| 84 ||align="right"| 110,159 ||align="right"| 99,024 || Sverdlovsk
|-
| Sverdlovsky || Свердловський (район) || raion ||align="right"| 1,132 ||align="right"| 14,574 ||align="right"| 12,210 || Sverdlovsk
|-
| Troitsky || Троїцький (район)|| raion ||align="right"| 1,633 ||align="right"| 25,704 ||align="right"| 21,205 || Troitske
|-
| Total Oblast|| Луганська (Область) || oblast ||align="right"| 26,683 ||align="right"| 2,546,178 ||align="right"| 2,272,676 || Luhansk
|}

Like the rest of the provinces in Ukraine, Luhansk Oblast has a double jurisdiction. The oblast is predominantly administrated by the Luhansk Oblast State Administration, headed by the governor of the oblast, who is appointed by the President of Ukraine. The province has a representative body, the provincial council, which is headed by its chairman and elected by popular vote.

The province is primarily divided into 18 raions (districts), and  37 cities, including 14 cities of regional significance. The administrative center is Luhansk. These raions are listed below with their areas and populations.

The province's secondary division consists of various municipalities. Those municipalities may consist of one or more populated places. The municipalities are administratively subordinate to the raion in which they are located, with the exception of 14 cities subordinated directly to the oblast. The city of Luhansk is subdivided into its own four city-districts (boroughs).

All subdivisions are governed by their respective councils (radas).

Cities
* regional municipalities

Demographics

The population is largely Russian-speaking, although ethnic Ukrainians constitute a majority (58.0%). Among the minorities are native Russians (39.1%), Belarusians (0.8%), and others (1.4%). Ukrainians constitute the majority in all raions except for Stanytsia-Luhanska Raion and Krasnodon Raion, both of which are east of Luhansk. Ethnic Russians also constitute the majority in regionally significant cities, such as Krasnodon, Sverdlovsk, Krasnyi Luch and Kadiivka.

In the 2001 Ukrainian Census, more than 68.8% of the population considered themselves Russian speakers, while 30.0% considered themselves Ukrainian speakers. The Russophone population predominates in the southern portion of the region and around the city of Luhansk, while the northern region is less populated, mostly agricultural and Ukrainophone.

Its population (as of 2004) of 2,461,506 constitutes 5.13% of the overall Ukrainian population. The Luhansk Oblast rates fifth in Ukraine by the number of its inhabitants, having an average population density of 90.28/km2. About 87% of the population lives in urban areas, while the remaining 13% reside in agricultural areas. According to the national census, 54% of the population are Ukrainians and 42% are Russians.

Age structure
 0-14 years: 12.3%  (male 143,272/female 134,803)
 15-64 years: 71.4%  (male 768,544/female 838,639)
 65 years and over: 16.3%  (male 117,782/female 248,914) (2013 official)

Median age
 total: 42.1 years 
 male: 38.2 years 
 female: 45.9 years  (2013 official)

Economy
Economically the region is connected with the Donets Basin.

Extracting industry
 Lysychansk Coal
 Luhansk Coal
 Sverdlov Anthracite
 Anthracite
 Pervomaisk Coal
 Rovenky Anthracite
 Donbas Anthracite

Machine building

 Luhanskteplovoz
 Krasnyi Luch Machine building Factory
 Pervomaisk Power mechanical Factory
 Stakhanov Railcar Plant

Metallurgy
 Alchevsk Metallurgy Combine
 Alchevsk Coke-chemical Factory

Chemical and oil refinery
 Sievierodonetsk Association Azot
 Association Skloplastyk
 Lysynchansk Oil Refinery

Agriculture
The oblast has post industrial sites which run off building material into surrounding land. Yakymchuk 2018 finds feral stands of Triticum aestivum'' have colonised several of these sites.

 Derkul Horse Factory

Power generation
 Sievierodonetsk Power Station
 Luhansk power station
 Shteriv power station (decommissioned in 1983)

Transport
There are 24 Russo-Ukrainian international border checkpoints of various entry.
  within the Luhansk Oblast uses highway  that starts from Debaltseve (Donetsk Oblast), passes through the city of Krasnyi Luch, and enters the Russian Federation at the border checkpoint "Dovzhansky" (settlement Dovzhanske, town of Biryukove).
  within the Luhansk Oblast uses highway  that starts from Debaltseve (Donetsk Oblast), passes through the city of Luhansk, and enters the Russian Federation at the border checkpoint "Izvaryne" (town of Izvaryne).
 There is also another highway  that runs from north to south and connects Starobilsk, Luhansk, and Krasnyi Luch with Donetsk.

Rail transportation is administered by the Donetsk Railway.

There is also its regional airport Luhansk International Airport with its own carrier.

Education

 East Ukrainian National University
 University of Luhansk
 Donbas State Technical University

Specialized
 Luhansk State Medical University
 Luhansk National Agrarian University
 Luhansk State University of Internal Affairs

Points of interest

The following sites were nominated for the Seven Wonders of Ukraine.
 The house of Dal's birth (Luhansk)
 Fighters for the Revolution monument
 Derkul horse factory
 Royal Rocks (Luhansk State Preserve)
 Chasm Steppe (Sverdlovsk Raion)
 Ram Foreheads (limestone rocks)
 Mścichowski Palace

Notable People

 Oleksiy Danilov (born 1962), Ukrainian politician
 Dov Markus (born 1946), Israeli-American soccer player, born in Ukraine.
 Serhiy Zhadan (born 1974), writer.

See also
 2014 Donbas status referendums

References

External links
 Official site of Luhansk Oblast Administration 
 Information Card of the Region – official site of the Cabinet of Ministers of Ukraine

 
Oblasts of Ukraine
States and territories established in 1938
Donbas
1938 establishments in Ukraine
Ukrainian territories claimed by Russia